Fateh Jang Tehsil (Punjabi and ) is an administrative subdivision (tehsil), of Attock District in the Punjab province of Pakistan lying between 33°10′ and 33°45′ North, and 72°23′ and 73°1′ East.  The tehsil is administratively subdivided into 14 Union Councils. A notable Kharosthi inscription is located near the main town of Fateh Jang, which is also the headquarters of the tehsil.

History
Until the independence of Pakistan in 1947, Fateh Jang was   under British rule, the Imperial Gazetteer of India describes the Tahsil (tehsil) as follows:

Languages
Inhabitants of Fateh Jang Tehsil speak Sohain dialect of Punjabi language, the name is derived from Sohan River.

References 

Tehsils of Punjab, Pakistan